Russian surname:
 Vladimir Dmitrievich Vilensky-Sibiryakov also referred to as V. D. Vilensky

Also Wilenski may refer to:

Konstanty Wileński, Soviet musician
Moshe Wilenski, Polish-born Israeli composer